The Brazilian–Argentine Agency for Accounting and Control of Nuclear Materials (ABACC;) is a binational safeguards agency playing an active role in the verification of the peaceful use of nuclear materials that could be used, either directly or indirectly, for the manufacture of weapons of mass destruction.

Nuclear cooperation between Argentina and Brazil traces back to 1986 with the signature of a protocol about immediate sharing of information and mutual assistance in case of nuclear accidents and radiological emergencies   The warm personal relationship that existed between Argentina's democratically elected president Raul Alfonsin and his Brazilian counterpart, João Figueiredo, further catalyzed the deepening of relations which is now understood to have begun under their authoritarian predecessors.

The ABACC was created on July 18, 1991 and is the only binational safeguards organization existing in the world and the first binational organization created by Argentina and Brazil.

As a regional agency dealing with safeguards, its main goal is guaranteeing Argentina, Brazil and the international community that all the nuclear materials are used exclusively for peaceful purposes.

See also
Argentine Atomic Energy Commission (CNEA)
Brazilian Nuclear Energy Commission (CNEN)
Brazil and weapons of mass destruction
Argentina and weapons of mass destruction
Argentina–Brazil relations
Institute of Nuclear Materials Management

References

External links
 Brazil
Center for the Development of Nuclear Technology (CDTN)
Eletronuclear - Eletrobrás Termonuclear S.A.
Energy and Nuclear Research Institute (IPEN)
Indústrias Nucleares do Brasil (INB)
Ministry of Foreign Relations (MRE)
Ministry of Science and Technology (MCT)
National Nuclear Energy Commission (CNEN)
Nuclear Engineering Institute (IEN)
Radiation Protection and Dosimetry Institute (IRD)
The Navy’s Technological Center in São Paulo (CTMSP)

 Argentina
Bariloche Atomic Center (CAB)
Combustibles Nucleares Argentinos (Conuar) 
Constituyentes Atomic Center (CAC)
Ezeiza Atomic Center (CAE)
Investigación Aplicada S.E. (INVAP)
Ministry of Foreign Relations, International Trade and Worship (MREyC)
National Atomic Energy Commission (CNEA)
Nuclear Regulatory Authority (ARN)
Nucleoeléctrica Argentina S.A. (NASA)

Brazil and Argentina
Woodrow Wilson Center's Nuclear Proliferation International History Project (NPIHP)
 

Nuclear organizations
Nuclear regulatory organizations
Arms control
Nuclear weapons policy
Nuclear technology in Brazil
Nuclear technology in Argentina
Treaties establishing nuclear-weapon-free zones
Organizations established in 1991
1991 in international relations
Argentina–Brazil relations
1991 establishments in South America